Oenospila is a genus of moths in the family Geometridae erected by Charles Swinhoe in 1892.

Species
 Oenospila altistrix
 Oenospila flavifusata
 Oenospila flavilinea
 Oenospila gemmans
 Oenospila kopperi
 Oenospila microstrix
 Oenospila moniliata
 Oenospila rufinotata
 Oenospila stellata

References

Hemitheini